The Mariposa County Courthouse in Mariposa, California was built in 1854, making it the oldest courthouse in California. It was listed as a California Historical Landmark in 1977.

Construction 

The Mariposa courthouse was designed and built by Fox & Shriver. It was finished in 1854. The total building costs came to $9,200. The first meeting was held on February 12, 1855. The clock and cupola were added in 1866. On April 21, the Yosemite Parlor No. 24, N.S.G.W., Merced, dedicated a quartz monument and bronze plaque in honor of the pioneers of Mariposa County.

Historical significance 

In 1851, Mariposa became home to many miners as the California Gold Rush began. This brought issues regarding mining laws, and there developed a necessity to have a place to try these disputes. The courthouse tried cases on other aspects of the laws, but it was the rulings on mining laws that set the courthouse apart from its counterparts. Legal precedents on federal mining laws were set based on rulings made here.

See also

 California Historical Landmarks in Mariposa County
 National Register of Historic Places listings in Mariposa County, California

References

External links
Yosemite Nature Notes

 

  

History of the Sierra Nevada (United States)
History of Mariposa County, California
1854 establishments in California
Courthouses on the National Register of Historic Places in California